The 1986 NHL Supplemental Draft was the first NHL Supplemental Draft. It was held on September 17, 1986.

Selections by round

Round one
The first round was limited to teams that missed the 1986 Stanley Cup playoffs.

Round two

See also
1986 NHL Entry Draft
1986–87 NHL season
List of NHL players

Notes

References

External links
 1986 NHL Supplemental Draft player stats at The Internet Hockey Database
 1986 NHL Supplemental Draft Pick Transactions at Pro Sports Transactions

Draft
1986